The 1975 Munich WCT was a men's tennis tournament played on indoor carpet courts in Munich, West Germany. The tournament was part of Green Group of the 1975 World Championship Tennis circuit. It was the third edition of the event and was held from 10 March through 16 March 1975. First-seeded Arthur Ashe won the singles title.

Finals

Singles

 Arthur Ashe defeated  Björn Borg 6–4, 7–6

Doubles
 Bob Hewitt /  Frew McMillan defeated  Corrado Barazzutti /  Antonio Zugarelli 6–3, 6–4

References

External links
 ITF tournament edition details

Munich WCT
Munich WCT